Without Mercy may refer to:

Without Mercy (film), American silent melodrama directed in 1925 by George Melford
Without Mercy (album), 1984 release by English band The Durutti Column
Without Mercy (Omnia album), 2000 release, under its Latin title Sine Missione, by Dutch band Omnia